The 2012−2013 Volleyleague is the 45th season of the Greek national volleyball league. Olympiacos was the winner beating Pamvochaikos in the finals. This was Olympiacos' 26th Championship. The teams that were relegated were Iraklis Thessaloniki (because of financial problems) and AONS Milon. The MVP of championship was awarded to Olympiacos' Boyan Yordanov.

Teams

Regular season 

 

|}

1Foinikas Syros has -3 points from previous season

2Iraklis Thessaloniki has -2 points from previous season

Playoffs

Semifinals

(1) Olympiacos – (4) Ethnikos Alexandroupoli (3−0)

(2) Pamvochaikos – (3) PAOK Thessaloniki(3−0)

Finals

(1) Olympiacos – (2) Pamvochaikos(3−1)

Places 5-8 and Playout

Semifinals (5-8 places)

Final (5-6 places)

(5) Foinikas Syros – (6) Aris(2−0)

Play Out (9-11 places)

Final standings

Final standings

Notes
 Iraklis Thessaloniki was relegated to A2 division due to debts, after the decision of Greek sport court (ΑΣΕΑΔ).

References

External links
Official site

Volleyball competitions in Greece
2012 in Greek sport
2013 in Greek sport
2012 in volleyball
2013 in volleyball